Minha Loja de Discos (miɲa loʒa dɛ dʒiscos; English: My Record Store) is a television documentary series introducing some of the most interesting and charming independent records stores and presenting the local music scenes of different cities. It is created by independent production house Ton Ton Films in co-production with Canal Bis. There have been 3 seasons of the program so far, with the first season focusing on the UK, the second season on the USA and the third season being a worldwide one. Each season includes 13 episodes (27 minutes each). Each of the episodes introduces one independent record store and its affiliated music scene, featuring owners, musicians, associated and local bands as well as staff and customers.

The first season was initially broadcast weekly on the Brazilian TV channel Canal Bis over the period of three months, from July to September 2013. The second season was initially broadcast from September to November 2014, and the third season was broadcast from September to November 2015.

Minha Loja de Discos was very positively reviewed by the Brazilian press and audience. The second season was the largest Brazilian production ever made about North American music.

Minha Loja de Discos was directed and produced by Elisa Kriezis and Rodrigo Pinto, scripted by Kika Serra and Pedro Serra, and edited by Felipe David Rodrigues.

First season: Minha Loja de Discos UK
Record Store Day - UK
Sister Ray - London
Jumbo Records - Leeds
Truck Store - Oxford
Rough Trade - London
Resident - Brighton
Monorail - Glasgow
Piccadilly Records - Manchester
Rise - Bristol
Sounds of the Universe - London
The Diskery - Birmingham
Phonica - London
Spillers - Cardiff

Among the featured artists are The Maccabees, Franz Ferdinand, The Staves, Portishead, Bat for Lashes, Primal Scream, CHVRCHES, Alt-J, Peter Hook, Gilles Peterson, Gang of Four, Anika, Blood Red Shoes, Band of Skulls, Erol Alkan, 2manyDJs/Soulwax, Ikonika, Sweet Baboo, Matthew E. White, Public Service Broadcasting (band), Bipolar Sunshine, Empty Pools, and many more.

Second season: Minha Loja de Discos USA

Louisiana Music Factory - New Orleans
Amoeba Music - Los Angeles
Somewhere in Detroit - Detroit
 Jazz Record Mart - Chicago
Waterloo Records - Austin
Goner Records - Memphis
 Grimey's New and Preloved Music - Nashville
 Poobah Records - Los Angeles
 Academy Records - New York
 Aquarius Records - San Francisco
 Mississippi Records - Portland
 Hungry Ear Records - Honolulu
Easy Street Records - Seattle

Among the featured artists are Jeff Mills, Carl Craig, North Mississippi Allstars, Mudhoney, The Head and the Heart, Ahmad Jamal, Pixies, Deerhoof, Warpaint, Moby, OK Go, Animal Collective, Marky Ramone (Ramones), Lee Ranaldo (Sonic Youth), Au Revoir Simone, Cut Chemist (Jurassic 5), The Black Angels, Johnny Winter, White Denim, Brendan Benson, Preservation Hall Jazz Band, Radio Slave, Jon Spencer Blues Explosion, Rebirth Brass Band, Phil Cohran (ex- Sun Ra Arkestra), Tail Dragger, Carlos Niño, Stacey Pullen, Luluc, Ras G, Leviathan (musical project), Taj Mahal, Mike Banks (Underground Resistance), Black Joe Lewis, Ume, Trombone Shorty, Cyril Neville (Neville Brothers, The Meters), Deap Vally, Aesop Dekker (Ludicra, Agalloch), DJ Kutmah, Carl Cox, Crystal Stilts, and many more.

Third season: Minha Loja de Discos Worldwide

 Pet Sounds - Stockholm
 Louie Louie - Lisbon
 Balades Sonores - Paris
Smekkleysa - Reykjavik
Baratos Afins - São Paulo
 Chico - Beirut
Hard Wax - Berlin
 Third Ear - Tel Aviv
 RPM Records - Bogota
 Tropicalia Records - Rio de Janeiro
 Mercurio Disqueria - Buenos Aires
 Casa Brasilis - São Paulo
 Discos Bora Bora - Granada

References

External links
Official page Canal Bis
Official page Ton Ton Films

2010s Brazilian television series
2010s Brazilian documentary television series
2013 Brazilian television series debuts
Brazilian documentary television series
Brazilian travel television series
Portuguese-language television shows
Documentary television series about music